Fraser Lee Adams (1868-1929) was an American politician who served two terms as mayor of Huntsville, Alabama, from 1922 to 1926. He had previously served as a Huntsville City Alderman from 1918 to 1920 and as President of the Huntsville City Council from 1920 to 1922.

References

Mayors of Huntsville, Alabama
1868 births
1929 deaths
People from Jackson County, Florida